Yolanda Díaz Pérez (born 6 May 1971) is a Spanish politician and lawyer specialising in labour law, currently serving as Second Deputy Prime Minister since 2021 and Minister of Labour and Social Economy of the Government of Spain since 2020. A member of the Congress of Deputies since 2016, she has previously been a former Ferrol municipal councillor (2003–2012) and member of the Parliament of Galicia (2012–2016). She was the National Coordinator of Esquerda Unida (EU) from 2005 to 2017.

Early life and education 
Born in San Valentín, Fene, on 6 May 1971, next to the shipyard of Astilleros y Talleres del Noroeste (ASTANO), Díaz is a member of a family of renowned trade unionists in Galicia who were intricately involved in anti-Francoist activism. 

Díaz graduated with a licentiate degree in Law from the University of Santiago de Compostela (USC), and later earned three post-graduate degrees.  Upon concluding her studies, she commenced working as a paralegal for a law firm.   Later, she registered as a lawyer and opened her own law firm, which specialised in labour law.

Political career

Career in regional politics 
Díaz joined the Communist Party of Spain (PCE) at an early age, before  entering institutional politics in 2003, when she became member of the Ferrol municipal council.
In 2005, she was elected leader (National Coordinator) of Esquerda Unida (EU), the Galician federation of United Left (IU). 

Díaz stood as candidate in the list of the Galician Left Alternative (AGE) coalition between EU and Anova in the October 2012 Galician regional election, becoming a member of the 9th Parliament of Galicia, representing the constituency of A Coruña.

Career in national politics 
Díaz ran as a candidate for En Marea in the 2015 general election becoming a member of the 11th session of the Lower House of the Spanish parliament. She retained her seat in the 2016 and April 2019 and November 2019 general elections, running as candidate for the En Marea in the former, En Común–Unidas Podemos and Galicia en Común in the latter. She left the role of EU Coordinator General in June 2017, being replaced by Eva Solla.

Following the failure of talks to build a coalition government between the PSOE and Unidas Podemos in the summer of 2019, Díaz spoke out in favour of such a coalition, unlike other voices within IU.  She advocated the sole investiture of Pedro Sánchez, while reaching an agreement on a programme for government.   She distanced herself from IU over disagreements over how IU had handled the negotiations and eventually left the party in October 2019, while remaining a member of the PCE.

Minister of Labour, 2020–present 
Appointed as minister of Labour and Social Economy of the Sánchez II Government, Díaz was sworn in on 13 January 2020. Díaz, who put the struggle against precarious work as the main goal of her mandate, vowed to repeal the 2012 labour market reform. She chose Joaquín Pérez Rey to hold the post of Secretary of State for Labour and Social Economy, making him the effective second-in-command in the Ministry.

As Minister of Labour, Díaz took part in the negotiations that paved the way for the increase of the minimum wage to 950 euros per month, in addition to outlawing employee dismissal for medical leave. She also took part in the dispatch of labour inspections to the agricultural sector to monitor the working conditions of rural workers. In response to the COVID-19 pandemic, Diaz negotiated with unions and employers the implementation of a furlough scheme (in Spanish Expediente de Regulación Temporal de Empleo; ERTE) and its extensions, as well as the creation of the 'Working From Home Law' (in Spanish, Ley del Teletrabajo).

On 15 March 2021, the then second vice-president of the government, Pablo Iglesias, announced that he would leave the post to run as Podemos candidate for the regional elections in the Community of Madrid, which had been brought forward due to the collapse of the conservative government of Isabel Díaz Ayuso formed by PP and Ciudadanos, with the support of Vox.  Announcing his candidacy, Pablo Iglesias handed over the vice-presidency to Yolanda Díaz successor, who officially accepted the position that same day. On the same Monday, in a press conference from Montauban, the President of the Government, Pedro Sánchez, also confirmed the succession of the vice-presidency to Díaz, declaring that he had "the highest regard" for her. In July 2021, Díaz was promoted from third to second Deputy Prime Minister.

In November, Díaz announced her intention to create a political platform to contest the next Spanish general elections, starting a "listening process" after the Christmas holidays, popularly identified by the media as a "broad front". That same month, he also announced that by the end of 2022 labour reforms under Mariano Rajoy would be abolished and replaced. It was finally approved on 3 February 2022.

Also in November 2021, Díaz led a group of left-leaning female leaders (Ada Colau, Mónica Oltra, Mónica García, and Fátima Hamed Hossain) in unveiling a new initiative called Otras Políticas, a play on words meaning both "other female politicians" and "other policies".

On 18 May 2022, Díaz publicly announced a new electoral platform, named Sumar ("Unite") with the intention to contest the 2023 Spanish elections.

Notes

References 

Living people
1971 births
21st-century Spanish women politicians
Spanish women lawyers
Politicians from Galicia (Spain)
Members of the 9th Parliament of Galicia
Members of the 11th Congress of Deputies (Spain)
Members of the 12th Congress of Deputies (Spain)
Members of the 13th Congress of Deputies (Spain)
Members of the 14th Congress of Deputies (Spain)
University of Santiago de Compostela alumni
People from Ferrol (comarca)
United Left (Spain) politicians
Communist Party of Spain politicians
Deputy Prime Ministers of Spain